Sham Sherpur is a village in Batala in Gurdaspur district of Punjab State, India. Popular name of this village is Chittorgarh. The village is administrated by Sarpanch an elected representative of the village.
Sarpanch's name Harkawalpreet Singh
Mobile number +919878266631

Demography 
, The village has a total number of 477 houses and the population of 2558 of which 1325 are males while 1233 are females.  According to the report published by Census India in 2011, out of the total population of the village 1553 people are from Schedule Caste and the village does not have any Schedule Tribe population so far.

See also
List of villages in India

References

External links 
 Tourism of Punjab
 Census of Punjab

Villages in Gurdaspur district